Solandra  is a genus of flowering plants in the nightshade family, Solanaceae. It is named after the Swedish naturalist Daniel C. Solander.

The vines it contains are commonly known as chalice vines and are native to the Caribbean, Mexico and South America. They have very large flowers and glossy foliage.
Also called Cup of Gold.

Solandra grandiflora was once (and likely still is) used by the Huichol of Mexico and other tribes of the region where it is known by the name "kieli" or "kieri" with some archaeological evidence supporting the theory that its use as a hallucinogen predates that of peyote (Lophophora williamsii). A tea from the branches and more so from the roots and fruits is used as an inebriant in native traditions. The alkaloids present include atropine, noratropine, hyoscyamine, and tropine with about 0.15% overall content in the leaves.

In all ten species are recognized:
 Solandra boliviana
 Solandra brachycalyx 
 Solandra brevicalyx
 Solandra grandiflora
 Solandra guerrerensis
 Solandra guttata
 Solandra longiflora
 Solandra maxima
 Solandra nizandensis
 Solandra paraensis

Selected species

References

External links

 Solandra longiflora from Ecuador 2013
USDA GRIN database: Solandra

Solanoideae
Solanaceae genera
Vines
Taxa named by Olof Swartz